Kid3 is an open-source cross-platform audio tag editor for many audio file formats. It supports DSF, MP3, Ogg, FLAC, MPC, MPEG-4 (mp4/m4a/m4b), AAC, Opus, SPX, TrueAudio, APE, WavPack, WMA, WAV, AIFF, tracker modules.

Features
 Edit and convert between ID3v1.1, ID3v2.3 and ID3v2.4 tags.
 Access to all tag fields.
 Batch edit tags of multiple files.
 Generate tags from filenames or from the contents of other tag fields.
 Generate filenames from tags, rename and create directories from tags.
 Generate playlist files.
 Automatically convert upper and lower case and replace strings.
 Search and filter files by tags.
 Import from gnudb.org, TrackType.org, MusicBrainz, Discogs, Amazon and other sources of album data.
 Automatic batch import of metadata and cover art for multiple albums from different sources.
 Import using acoustic fingerprints and AcoustID.
 Export tags as CSV, HTML, playlists, Kover XML and in other formats.

See also

 List of tag editors
 ID3
 M3U
 List of KDE applications

References

Bibliography

External links
 

Audio software that uses Qt
Cross-platform free software
Free audio software
Free software programmed in C++
Linux audio video-related software
Tag editors
Tag editors for Linux
Tag editors that use Qt